Queer Eye is an American reality television series that aired on Bravo from 2003 to 2007.  On January 24, 2017, Netflix announced it has ordered a new season of Queer Eye with eight episodes, with the original Fab Five set to be replaced by new members.

Series overview

Episodes

Season 1 (2003–04)

Season 2 (2004–05)

Season 3 (2005–06)

Season 4 (2006)

Season 5 (2007)

References

External links 
 

Lists of American non-fiction television series episodes